The following is a list of ferry operators.

Africa
Algerie Ferries/ENTMV (Algeria – Spain, France)
Comarit (Morocco – Spain, France, Italy)
Comanav (Morocco – Spain, France)
Cotunav (Tunisia – France)
El Salam Maritime (Egypt – Saudi Arabia)
P&O (Angola – Canada)
SF (Senegal – Canada)

Asia

Archipelago Philippine Ferries Corporation (Visayas, Mindanao, Luzon, Batangas, Philippines)
ASDP Indonesia Ferry (Indonesia)
Montenegro Shipping Lines (Visayas, Mindanao, Luzon, Philippines)
Weesam Express (Visayas, Mindanao, Philippines)
Cokaliong Shipping Lines (Visayas, Mindanao, Philippines)
Trans-Asia Shipping Lines (Visayas, Mindanao, Philippines)
Aleson Shipping Lines (Visayas, Mindanao, Philippines, Sandakan)
2GO Travel (Luzon, Visayas, Mindanao, Philippines)
Cebu Ferries (Cebu, Philippines)
Cruise Ferries
Negros Navigation (Manila, Philippines)
Penang Ferry Service (George Town, Penang, Malaysia)
SSTH Ocean Arrow
Star Ferry (Victoria Harbour, Hong Kong)
SuperFerry (Manila, Philippines)

Europe

A-M

Aegean Speed Lines (Greece)
Ålandstrafiken (mainland Finland to Åland)
Algérie Ferries (Algeria to Spain and France)
Amey plc (Windermere Ferry)
ANEK Lines (Italy to Greece)
Argyll and Bute Council (Firth of Lorne and Loch Linnhe)
Azerbaijan Caspian Shipping Company (Caspian Sea)
Baleària (mainland Spain to Balearics, Morocco and Canary Islands in association with Fred. Olsen express)
Blue Star Ferries (Greece, Aegean Islands)
BornholmerFærgen (to Denmark, Germany and Sweden)
Bristol Ferry Boats (in Bristol Harbour)
Brittany Ferries  (UK to France, Spain and Ireland)
Brownsea Island Ferries Ltd (Poole Harbour)
Caledonian MacBrayne (Scotland)
Caremar (Italy) 
Color Line (Norway to Denmark, Germany and Sweden)
Condor Ferries (Channel Islands, UK)
Corsica Ferries-Sardinia Ferries (Italy and France to Corsica and Sardinia)
Destination Gotland (Swedish mainland to Gotland)
DFDS Seaways (Baltic Sea, North Sea, Channel)
Eckerö Line (Baltic Sea)
Eimskip Vestmannaeyjar, Iceland
Finnlines (Northern Europe)
Fjord Line (Denmark to Norway)
Fjord1 Nordvestlandske (Norway)
Fosen Trafikklag (Norway)
Fred. Olsen Express (Canary Islands including Huelva)
Gosport Ferry Company Ltd (Gosport to Portsmouth)
Grandi Navi Veloci (Italy - Med)
Grimaldi Lines (Italy - Med)
Hellenic Seaways (Greece)
HH-Ferries (Sweden - Denmark)
Highland Regional Council (Corran Ferry – Loch Linnhe)
Hurtigruten (Norway domestic)
İdo (Turkey domestic)
Levante Ferries (Greece)
Irish Ferries (Irish Sea, Celtic Sea)
Isle of Man Steam Packet (Isle of Man, Irish Sea)
Isle of Wight Council (Cowes Floating Bridge)
Isles of Scilly Steamship Company (English mainland to Isles of Scilly)
Jadrolinija (Croatia domestic, Croatia to Italy)
Kihnu Veeteed (Estonia)
King Harry Steam Ferry Company Ltd (River Fal)
Lake Koman Ferry (Northern Albania)
Maregiglio (Italy)
Merseytravel (Mersey Ferry)
Minoan Lines (Italy to Greece)
Moby Lines (Italy and the Mediterranean)
Molslinjen (Denmark)

N-Z
Namsos Trafikkselskap (Norway)
Naviera Armas -Armas Trasmediterránea group (Mainland Canary Islands including Huelva to Canary Islands, Spain to Morocco)
NorthLink Ferries (Orkney and Shetland, Scotland)
Orkney Ferries (Orkney, Scotland)
P&O Ferries (United Kingdom to France; Netherlands, Belgium and Spain)
P&O Irish Sea (Irish sea)
Pentland Ferries (Orkney, Scotland)
Polferries (the Baltic Sea)
Red Funnel (Isle of Wight to mainland England.)
Royal Borough of Greenwich (Woolwich Ferry across the River Thames)
Saremar (Italy)
Scandlines (Baltic Sea)
Shetland Islands Council (internal Shetland islands)
Silja Line (Finland to Sweden)
Siremar (Italy)
Smyril Line (North Sea & the North Atlantic)
SNAV (Italy and the Mediterranean)
Stena Line (North Sea, Irish Sea, Baltic Sea)
Strandfaraskip Landsins (within the Faroe Islands)
Superfast Ferries (Athens; Adriatic)
Tallink (the Baltic Sea)
TESO (Den Helder to Texel, Netherlands)
Thames Clippers (services on the River Thames including Canary Wharf - Rotherhithe Ferry)
The Salty Blonde (Alderney to Guernsey)
Tirrenia di Navigazione (Italy)
Transtejo & Soflusa (Lisbon, Portugal)
Trasmediterránea -Naviera Armas Trasmediterránea group (mainland Spain to Balearics, Canary Islands, Algeria and Morocco)
Toremar (Italy)
Torghatten Trafikkselskap (Norway)
TS Laevad (Estonia)
TT-Line (Germany and Poland to Sweden)
Unity Line (Świnoujście to Ystad and Świnoujście to Trelleborg)
Venezia Lines (Italy to Croatia and Slovenia)
Ventouris Ferries (Italy to Greece)
Viking Line (the Baltic Sea)
Waxholmsbolaget (Stockholm, Sweden)
Western Ferries (Clyde) Ltd (Firth of Clyde)
Wightlink (Isle of Wight to mainland England)
Zürichsee-Fähre Horgen-Meilen (Lake Zurich, Switzerland)

North America

Alaska Marine Highway System (ports across Alaska as well as Prince Rupert, British Columbia and Bellingham, Washington)
Anderson Ferry (Cincinnati, Ohio) (goes across the Ohio River to allow Ohio residents quick access to Kentucky and vice versa)
Arctic Umiaq Line (coastal ferry along the western coast of Greenland)
Arkansas Highway and Transportation Department (operates one ferry across Bull Shoals Lake)
Augusta Ferry (service between Higginsport, Ohio, and Augusta, Kentucky)
Bay Ferries (eastern Canada and US, Caribbean Sea)
BC Ferries (British Columbia, Canada)
BillyBey Ferry Company (Weehawken, New Jersey)
Black Ball Transport (Olympic Peninsula to Vancouver Island)
Block Island Express (New London, Connecticut, to Block Island, Rhode Island)
Blue and Gold Fleet (connects San Francisco with Sausalito, Tiburon, Angel Island, Oakland, Alameda, and Vallejo) (San Francisco, California)
Bridgeport & Port Jefferson Ferry (Bridgeport, Connecticut, to Port Jefferson, New York)
California Department of Transportation operates the Howard Landing Ferry on the California Delta
Clackamas County, Oregon (Canby Ferry) Cable pulled ferry across the Willamette River in the vicinity of Canby, Oregon
Cape May–Lewes Ferry (service between Cape May County, New Jersey, and Lewes, Delaware, across the Delaware Bay)
Casco Bay Lines (service between Portland, Maine, and the Islands of Casco Bay)
Cave-In-Rock Ferry (service between Cave-In-Rock, Illinois, and rural Crittenden County, Kentucky)
Chester-Hadlyme ferry (seasonal ferry operating on the Connecticut River)
Cross Sound Ferry (New London, Connecticut, to Orient, New York)
Delaware State Parks runs ferry services to Pea Patch Island State Park from Delaware City, Delaware, and Fort Mott (New Jersey)
Diskoline (domestic passenger-only ferries in the Disko Bay area in Greenland; summer services only due to sea ice in winter)
Fire Island Ferries (service between Bay Shore, New York, and Fire Island, New York, across the Great South Bay)
Fraser River Marine Transportation Ltd. (British Columbia, Canada)
Golden Gate Transit (ferries in the San Francisco Bay Area)
Governors Island Alliance (New York City)
Harris County, Texas (operates a ferry across Buffalo Bayou near the San Jacinto Monument)
Hatton Ferry (James River, Virginia)
Hornblower Cruises (San Francisco)
Inter-Island Ferry Authority (five Southeast Alaskan communities)
Jacksonville Water Taxi (Jacksonville, Florida)
Jet Express (U.S. Lake Erie Islands)
Lake Champlain Transportation Company (on Lake Champlain in the United States)
Lake Express (on Lake Michigan)
Lake Michigan Carferry (operates the SS Badger)
Liberty Water Taxi (Jersey City, New Jersey)
Louisiana Department of Transportation and Development (LDOTD)
Marine Atlantic (Atlantic Canada)
MBTA boat (Boston)
Metro Transit (public transit routes in Halifax, Nova Scotia)
Millersburg Ferry (Susquehanna River, Pennsylvania, between Millerburg and Liverpool, Pennsylvania)
New York Water Taxi (New York City)
North Carolina Ferry System (operates eight ferry routes)
Northumberland Ferries (eastern Canada)
NY Waterway (Weehawken, New Jersey)
Owen Sound Transportation Company Limited, Tobermory, Ontario
Oxford–Bellevue Ferry (Talbot County, Maryland)
Plaquemines Parish, Louisiana
RiverLink Ferry (between Philadelphia and Camden, New Jersey across the Delaware River)
Rocky Hill-Glastonbury ferry (seasonal ferry operating on the Connecticut River)
Sistersville Ferry (crosses the Ohio River between Sistersville, West Virginia and the unincorporated community of Fly, Ohio)
Société des traversiers du Québec (Quebec, Canada)
Staten Island Ferry (New York City)
The Steamship Authority (Nantucket Sound, Massachusetts)
Texas Department of Transportation (operates two ferries, one at Galveston, Texas, and the other at Port Aransas, Texas)
Toronto Parks, Forestry and Recreation Division (operate three Toronto Island ferries)
Toronto Port Authority (operate one island airport ferry)
Utah Department of Transportation/UDOT operates the Charles Hall Ferry across Lake Powell connecting UT 276 inside Glen Canyon National Recreation Area.
Valley View Ferry (connects Jessamine County and Lexington, Kentucky, with Madison County via SR 169 at the Kentucky River)
VDOT provides free car ferry services in Southern Virginia, including the Jamestown Ferry
Washington State Ferries (northwest US)
White's Ferry, a cable ferry between Maryland and Virginia
Woodland Ferry, cable ferry located in western Sussex County, Delaware, spanning the Nanticoke River at Woodland, Delaware, west of the city of Seaford

In addition, a private operator runs a ferry across the Current River in Missouri, at Akers Ferry crossing in the Ozark National Scenic Riverways.

Oceania

Australian National Line
Bluebridge (connects North Island and South Island in New Zealand)
Captain Cook Cruises, Australia
Captain Cook Cruises Western Australia
Central Coast Ferries
Church Point Ferry
Cronulla & National Park Ferry Cruises
Fullers Ferries (Waitemata Harbour and inner Hauraki Gulf ferry service)
Hawkesbury River Ferries
Hobart Historic Cruises (Derwent River)
Interisland Line (connects North Island and South Island in New Zealand)
Kangaroo Island SeaLink (mainland South Australia to Kangaroo Island)
Matilda Cruises
Mona((Derwent River)
My Fast Ferry 
Newcastle Transport
Peninsula Searoad Transport (crossing Port Phillip)
Pennicott Wilderness Journeys (Derwent River, Bruny Island, Port Arthur-Eaglehawk Neck)
Peppermint Bay Cruises (Derwent River)
Port Arthur Historic Site)
RiverCity Ferries
SeaLink Travel Group (Great Barrier Island ferry service)
Searoad Ferries (Ro/Ro ferries across Bass Strait)
Spirit of Tasmania (Ro/Pax ferries connecting Tasmania to Victoria)
Sydney Ferries (Sydney, Australia)
Tasmanian Steam Navigation Company
Toll Domestic Forwarding (former owner of Interisland Line; now Ro/Ro ferries across Bass Strait)
Transdev Sydney Ferries
Transport for NSW (various inland crossings)

South America
Conferry (connects Isla Margarita to mainland Venezuela)
Ferries that connect Colonia, Uruguay and Montevideo, Uruguay  to Buenos Aires, Argentina:
Buquebus
Colonia Express
Navimag (Chile)
Transbordadora Austral Broom S.A. (Chile)

See also
 List of cruise lines
 List of largest cruise lines

References

 
Ferry Operators